Archery at the 2011 Pacific Games in Nouméa, New Caledonia was held on 6–9 September 2019.

Medal summary

Medal table

Notes
 Host nation New Caledonia won twelve archery medals including seven gold.

 The Tahitian archers took home thirteen medals including three gold. Hauarii Winkelstroer won four medals, including two gold (one in individual competition, and one in team competition). Stéphane Fabisch also won an individual gold medal.

Men

Women

Mixed

See also
 Archery at the Pacific Games

References

Sources

External links 
Archery at the 2011 Pacific Games

2011 Pacific Games
Archery at the Pacific Games
Pacific Games